Volevo i pantaloni (also known as Good Girls Don't Wear Trousers and I Wanted Pants) is a 1990 Italian coming-of-age drama film directed by Maurizio Ponzi. It is based on the bestseller novel Good Girls Don't Wear Trousers written by Lara Cardella.  The film was a bomb at the Italian box office, grossing about one billion lire in spite of a budget of five billion lire.

Plot  
Annetta is a teenage girl living in rural Italy who attends highschool and lives with her strict parents and brother. Her parents don't allow her much freedom and expect her to comply to traditional cultural norms, especially in relation to how women must behave. Something she has always longed for is to wear trousers, yet her mother forbids her since she doesn't want the other families in the village thinking that Annetta is a "puttana".

Annetta is desperate to wear trousers so decides to become a puttana. To learn how, she befriends Angelina, one of the popular girls, who soon invites her to a party. At the party she meets Nicola, who ends up driving her home. Over the next few weeks, Annetta continues to catch up with Angelina and Nicola but one day, when at the beach, her uncle spots her at wearing 'slutty' clothes, make-up and kissing Nicola. He confronts her and drives her back to her parents' house. Her parents are furious! They beat her and demand to know the name of the boy, but she refuses to tell them since if she does, they will make her marry him. Annetta is pulled out of school and forbidden to leave her room.

Ridiculous rumours soon spread throughout the village that Annetta was discovered naked having a threesome. Her mother is devastated that shame has been brought upon the family and has a breakdown, unable to cook or work for weeks, which infuriates Annetta's father. Eventually it is decided that she should be sent to live with her other uncle and aunt since her parents can't bear to look at her.

At first, life with her aunt is fantastic! Her aunt is far less conservative than her parents and even allows her to wear trousers, however she soon uncovers dark family secrets and becomes desperate to return to her old life.

Cast 

Giulia Fossà: Anna
Lucia Bosè: Grazia
Ángela Molina: Aunt Vannina
Natasha Hovey: Angelina
Tony Palazzo: Nicola
Pino Colizzi: Uncle Vincenzino
Luciano Catenacci: Michele

See also    
 List of Italian films of 1990

References

External links

1990 films
1990s teen drama films
1990 drama films
Films based on Italian novels
Films set in Sicily
Films set in the 1980s
Italian coming-of-age drama films
Films directed by Maurizio Ponzi
1990s coming-of-age drama films
Italian teen films
1990s Italian-language films
1990s Italian films